Make Sure They See My Face is the second studio album by American singer-songwriter Kenna. It was released on October 16, 2007 via Interscope and Star Trak labels. The record includes two singles.

Recording 
Recording for the album took place at: Virginia Beach (Hovercraft Studios, Mixstar Studio), Norfolk (Lopside Studios), Los Angeles (The Record Plant), Studio City (Ringside Studios), New York (Allido Studios), London (Whitfield Street Studios)

Background 
The inspiration for the album came from Kenna's attempt to climb Mount Kilimanjaro, the title, inspired from a phone calls by Neptunes' Pharrell Williams asking Kenna; "are you going make sure they see your face?". Kenna's Kilimanjaro climb took him to 18,200 feet before he fell ill from taking a sulfur-based altitude medicine, one he was unaware he was allergic to.

Upon the album's British release in May 2008, Kenna told noted UK R&B writer Pete Lewis of the award-winning Blues & Soul: "I actually went in to make an album that unifies all walks. As a person I've always been between worlds. I've always had to be someone who adapts, someone who's a chameleon of sorts. So vocally, musically spiritually, and in my life I've constantly tended to approach things with the idea of just bringing things together and not limiting myself whatsoever. So musically that's what this record is to me - a fusion of all worlds and a unifier."

Singles 
"Out of Control (State of Emotion)" was released as the lead single of the album on December 19, 2006. "Say Goodbye to Love" was released on August 21, 2007.

Accolades 
The first single "Say Goodbye to Love" was nominated for a Grammy in the Best Alternative R&B Performance Category.

Track listing 
All songs produced by The Neptunes and Kenna.

Release history

Credits
 Kenna - lead vocals, production, executive producer, songwriting 
 The Neptunes - production, instruments
 Chad Hugo - songwriting (tracks: 1, 2, 5, 6, 8-10, 12)
 Pharrell Williams - songwriting (tracks: 3, 4)
 Chester Kamen - additional guitar (tracks: 1, 8, 9, 11)
 Damon Crawford - drums (tracks: 2)
 Patrick Matera - guitar (tracks: 2)
 Kenna, Morningbreath - art direction, design
 Danny Betancourt - engineering
 Ali, Andrew Coleman, Anthony Kilhoffer, John Hanes, Richard Reitz, Scott Thomas, Scott Wilson, Tim Roberts - additional engineering 
 Chris Gehringer- mastering
 Serban Ghenea - mixing
 Michael Muller - photography (tracks: 2)

References

2007 albums
Interscope Records albums
Star Trak Entertainment albums
Albums produced by the Neptunes
Albums produced by Kenna
Kenna albums